Podemos por el Progreso del Perú , more often known by its shortened name Podemos Perú (PP), is a conservative political party in Peru. Founded in 2018 by economist and former congressman José Luna Gálvez. For the 2021 general election, Daniel Urresti was nominated by the party for the Presidency. In the election, Urresti placed 9th with 5.6% of the vote. While in the congressional election, the party won 5 seats, mainly from Lima, Callao and Ica.

History 
The legal officer of the National Office of Electoral Processes, Susana Guerrero, was discharged from the party for irregularities concerning the creation and registration of the party. In face of the crisis, Daniel Urresti, then candidate for Mayor of Lima, took over the leadership of the party.

2020 snap parliamentary elections 
For the 2020 snap parliamentary election, José Luna Gálvez announced that he would temporarily resign from the leadership of Podemos Perú, after being investigated in the case that surrounded former Lima Mayor Luis Castañeda to avoid "hurting the party".  Luna, also owner of the Telesup University, said that he did not participate in the elections either "so as not to damage the party." However, his son José Luna Morales did. The party won 11 seats in the Congressional elections in which, eight of them are coming from Lima. The party also received the most votes in Lima.

2021 general elections 
For the 2021 general election, Urresti was nominated by the party for the Presidency. However, on 4 February 2021, he was disqualified from the race, but he was reinstated in the race by the National Jury of Elections on 18 February. In the election, Urresti placed 9th with 5.6% of the vote. While in the congressional election, the party won 5 seats, mainly from Lima, Callao and Ica.

Electoral history

Presidential election

Elections to the Congress of the Republic of Peru

See also 
 List of political parties in Peru

References

2018 establishments in Peru
Conservative parties in Peru
Political parties established in 2018
Political parties in Peru
Populist parties
Social conservative parties